Air Chief Marshal Sir Malcolm David Pledger,  (born 24 July 1948) is a retired Royal Air Force officer.

RAF career
Pledger was educated at Heywood Grammar School (became part of a comprehensive in 1968 and is now Siddal Moor Sports College) and Newcastle University, where he read chemistry. Pledger then attended the RAF College, Cranwell where he completed his initial officer training. After basic flying training Pledger's flying career was on helicopters. He was appointed Officer Commanding No. 28 Squadron in 1978 and then commanded No. 240 Operational Conversion Unit before taking part in the Falklands War and commanding No. 28 Squadron. He became Station Commander of RAF Shawbury in 1990 before being appointed Air Officer Plans at Headquarters Strike Command in 1994. He went on to be Chief of Staff at Logistics Command in 1997, Air Officer Commanding-in-Chief at Logistics Command in April 1999 and Deputy Chief of the Defence Staff (Personnel) in September 1999. He was Chief of Defence Logistics from 2002 to 2005.

Family
He married Betty Kershaw; they have two sons.

References

|-

|-

1948 births
Alumni of Newcastle University
Graduates of the Royal Air Force College Cranwell
Knights Commander of the Order of the Bath
Living people
Officers of the Order of the British Empire
People educated at Heywood Grammar School
People from Heywood, Greater Manchester
People from Littleborough, Greater Manchester
Recipients of the Air Force Cross (United Kingdom)
Royal Air Force air marshals
Military personnel from Lancashire